Big Ben Kandukira, (born Venaune Ben Kandukira) is a Namibian performing and recording artist.  

After the release of his first album in 2001, Kandukira's work focused on Afro pop, Afrobeat, and fusion genres with a strong presence of tribal rhythms, melodies and local languages. Apart from securing himself a notable place in major musical events and festivals in Namibia, Kandukira has also performed in Europe.

Kandukira's music has been described to be a true Namibian sound and has been hailed as Namibia's top live music performer with a constant stage presence. Kandukira has released six albums to date and one collection of old and previously unreleased songs.

Early life 
Kandukira was born on 12 December 1978, in Omutiuanduko, a village in the Erongo Region of Namibia. From the age of eight, Kandukira learned to play a traditional four-string guitar, which he had received from a San man who worked at their homestead. He was introduced to a modern six-string guitar at the music department of the  Secondary School Swakopmund at Swakopmund in the Erongo Region.

The first of eight siblings, Kandukira has been the breadwinner for his family since the age of eighteen. In 1997, he moved to the capital city, Windhoek, to pursue a musical career. He joined the Bricks Community Theatre project, a community theatre group in Windhoek. During this time he played the keyboard for a disco band called Splendid while working on his own music.

Career 
Don't Bother is Kandukira's first release and was recorded at the Namibian Broadcasting Corporation's studio. The album consisted of songs in both Otjiherero, his native tongue, and English. Kandukira became more notable following the release of his second album, Moro Moro, in 2008, with his first hit song, "Moro Moro". Two other tracks on the album were included on the compilation album Africa Meets Hip Hop, Pop and Contemporary.

Kandukira's song "Social Avenue" (from his 2011 album of the same name) won for Best Jazz/Instrumental at the Namibian Annual Music Awards (NAMA). The album also contains the hit "Number 6 In The Jukebox" which has received considerable airplay in Namibia and online.

In 2014, Kandukira released First Collection, a collection of songs from his first six albums plus four new songs.

Back to the Basics, released in 2015, earned Kandukira four nominations and two awards at the 2016 NAMA, including Male Artist of the Year. The track "Ovombo", a direct interpretation of Omuhiva (the traditional style of music of the Ovaherero), won in the Best Traditional category. The album was first launched in Manchester, UK, in September 2015, before being released in Namibia later the same year.

Discography 
Don't Bother (2001)
Big Ben (2003)
Untitled (2005)
Moro Moro (2008)
Social Avenue (2011)
First Collection (2014)
Back to the Basics (2015)

Achievements

Competitions 
2007: Best Live Performer of the Year at the /Ae //Gams Arts and Cultural Festival
2013: Second Place, Last Band Standing Competition

Awards 
The following is a list of the awards that Kandukira has received:

2013: NAMA Best Jazz/Instrumental – "Social Avenue" from the Album Social Avenue
2015: Best Song with a Message – "Africa Penduka", a single later included on the album Back to the Basics
2016: NAMA Best Traditional for "Ovombo" and Best Male Artist of the Year

References 

1978 births
Living people
21st-century Namibian male singers
People from Erongo Region
Musicians from Windhoek